Alifakı is a village in Tarsus  district of Mersin Province, Turkey. At    it is situated in Çukurova (Cilicia of the antiquity) plains  to  the southeast of Tarsus. The population of Alifakı  is 972  as of 2011.

References

Villages in Tarsus District